Yasuo is a masculine Japanese given name.

Possible writings
Yasuo can be written using many different combinations of kanji characters. Here are some examples:

安雄, "tranquil, male"
安男, "tranquil, man"
安夫, "tranquil, husband"
安生, "tranquil; life"
保夫, "preserve, husband"
康郎, "healthy, son"
靖男, "peaceful, man"
泰雄, "peaceful, male"
八洲夫, "eight, continent, husband."

The name can also be written in hiragana やすお or katakana ヤスオ.

People with the name
, Japanese snowboarder
, the 58th Prime Minister of Japan, serving from 2007 to 2008
, Japanese film director
, formerly the chief copper trader at Sumitomo Corporation
, Japanese politician of the Democratic Party of Japan
, Japanese voice actor
, Japanese speed skater
, Japanese swimmer
, Japanese aikido teacher holding the rank of 8th dan Aikikai
, professional Go player
, Japanese-American painter, photographer and printmaker
, Japanese children's book author
Yasuo Matsui (ヤスオ・マツイ, 1877–1962), Japanese-American architect
, Japanese sport wrestler
, Japanese racewalker
, Japanese bobsledder
, Japanese animator
, the Ambassador of Japan to the Russian Federation
, Japanese football player
, Japanese swimmer
, former Japanese football player and manager
, founder and former chairman of Takefuji consumer finance group
Yasuo Tanaka (disambiguation), multiple people
, Japanese sport wrestler
, Japanese voice actor
, Japanese politician of the Democratic Party of Japan
, Japanese philosopher of religion

Fictional characters
 Yasuo, the Unforgiven, a character from League of Legends

References

Japanese masculine given names